Fettah Can (born 12 October 1975) is a Turkish singer-songwriter.

Life and career 
Fettah Can was born on 12 October 1975 in Karacabey, Bursa. His family is of Albanian descent. He spent his childhood in İnegöl. He became interested in music with his father's encouragement. In an interview, Can mentioned how he became a musician: "I would even be ashamed to sing at that young age. But at the request of my father, I started taking singing lessons at the municipal conservatory while working as a shop assistant during the day. On the other hand, I played lute and guitar. I had a lot of desire to write songs. And I wrote lyrics and composed in those years. On the other hand, I finished high school from outside, but I did not go to university. I trained myself with music lessons. I earned my living by singing in bars."

In order to pursue a professional music career, Can moved to Istanbul and first came to the attention of people by writing and composing a song for Emel Müftüoğlu, titled "Ara Ara". Together with his friend, Alper Narman, he wrote 11 songs for Hande Yener's 2002 album Sen Yoluna... Ben Yoluma..., after which she started writing and composing songs for Levent Yüksel, Gülben Ergen, Sibel Can and Murat Boz. He subsequently worked as a backing vocalist on the song "Yalnızlık" from Gülben Ergen's 2006 album. On his decision to become a singer, he said: "I'm a good singer. I also love being on the stage. I've been writing songs for years. I thought it would be fun to sing. Using my vocals in the song "Yalnızlık", which I gave to Gülben Ergen, was effective in this decision. Ergen called me to the stage at the Open Air concert. We sang the song, and people wanted to hear it again. That positive reaction there whipped me. I like my voice and I didn't want to deprive anyone of that sound."

In July 2010, he released his debut studio album Hazine. In the same year, he wrote and composed three songs for Greek singer Giorgos Mazonakis's Ta Isia Anapoda album. The album received a platinum certification in Greece.

Discography

Albums

Singles

References

External links 

 
 

1975 births
Turkish songwriters
Living people
Turkish guitarists
Turkish singer-songwriters
Turkish people of Albanian descent
People from Bursa Province